Erivelto Alixandrino da Silva (born 7 April 1982) is a Brazilian former professional footballer who played as forward.

Career
Erivelto was born in Guarulhos, Brazil. In the 2004–05 season he played with SFC Opava in the Gambrinus Liga, Czech top tier. Later he played in the Serbian First League with FK Srem during the second half of the 2006–07 season.

Erivelto joined Gabala in the Azerbaijan Premier League on loan for the latter half of the 2007–08 season, appearing twice in the league.

In September 2010 Erivelto signed a contract with Brasiliense until the May 2011, before then moving to Trindade in 2011. In January 2012 Erivelto joined Fluminense,  but less than two months later he moved to Botafogo-PB, and then onto América in January 2013 before cancelling his contract and retiring from the game to take an administrative job in his home town of Guarulhos in March of the same year.

Career statistics

References

External links

Living people
1982 births
Brazilian footballers
Association football forwards
Serbian First League players
SFC Opava players
FK Srem players
Gabala FC players
Brazilian expatriate footballers
Brazilian expatriate sportspeople in Azerbaijan
Expatriate footballers in Azerbaijan
Brazilian expatriate sportspeople in the Czech Republic
Expatriate footballers in the Czech Republic
Brazilian expatriate sportspeople in Serbia
Expatriate footballers in Serbia
People from Guarulhos
Footballers from São Paulo (state)